Larodryas is a genus of snout moths. It was described by Turner in 1922, and contains the species L. haplocala. It is found in Australia.

References

Endotrichini
Monotypic moth genera
Moths of Australia
Pyralidae genera